John Wills D.D. (died 16 June 1806) was an English academic administrator at the University of Oxford.

Wills was elected Warden of Wadham College, Oxford on 7 July 1783, a post he held until his death in 1806.
While Warden at Wadham College, Wills was also Vice-Chancellor of Oxford University from 1792 until 1796.

References

Year of birth missing
1806 deaths
Wardens of Wadham College, Oxford
Vice-Chancellors of the University of Oxford